Omid Hamid Namazi Zadeh  (born December 8, 1964) is an American retired soccer defender who is currently an assistant coach and the director of scouting for USL Championship club Hartford Athletic. Namazi played professionally in the American Soccer League, American Professional Soccer League, Major League Soccer, USISL and National Professional Soccer League where he was the 2001 Defender of the Year and he played for United States national futsal team. He is a two-time Coach of the Year in the Major Indoor Soccer League and coached in the Women's United Soccer Association. As assistant coach of Iran, he led the team to qualification to the 2014 FIFA World Cup and the 2015 AFC Asian Cup.

Early life
Namazi was born in Provo, Utah, when his father, Mehdi Namazi, was attending Brigham Young University to study for a master's degree. The family returned to Iran where Namazi grew up in Tehran. When he was eighteen, his father moved the family back to the United States after the Iranian Revolution. They settled in Washington, D.C. metro area of Herndon, Virginia. Namazi attended West Virginia University where he played on the men's soccer team from 1984 to 1987. He graduated with a bachelor's degree in exercise philosophy.

Playing career
In 1988, Namazi turned professional with the Washington Diplomats of the American Soccer League.  He spent two seasons with the Dips. Namazi played a handful of games with the Hershey Impact of the American Indoor Soccer Association during the 1989–1990 season before being released on January 13, 1990.  In 1990, he moved to the Maryland Bays of the American Professional Soccer League.  The Bays won the league championships that season.  He played the 1991 season in Maryland before moving to the Fort Lauderdale Strikers for the 1992 season.  Namazi played for Reading F.C. during the winter of 1992–1993.  In April 1993, he signed with the Los Angeles Salsa of the APSL and played two seasons with them.  In December 1994, he signed with the Baltimore Spirit of the National Professional Soccer League.  In 1995, he was selected as Second Team All Rookie.  In April 1995, the Seattle SeaDogs selected Namadi in the Continental Indoor Soccer League draft, but he declined to sign with them.  In 1996, he moved outdoors with the Delaware Wizards of the USISL.  He played with the MetroStars of Major League Soccer on loan from the Spirit on July 4, 1996.  In June 1996, the Philadelphia KiXX selected Namazi in the NPSL expansion draft.  In 1997, he was the USISL Defender of the Year with the New Jersey Stallions.  In August 1997, he joined the Carolina Dynamo late in the season.  In 1998, he played for the Staten Island Vipers.  Namazi continued to play for the KiXX until he left four games into the 2002–2003 season.  He was the 2001 NPSL Defender of the Year and won the 2002 MISL championship with the KiXX.  In 2001, he played four games for the South Jersey Barons of the USISL.  In December 2003, the Cleveland Force traded Steve Klein to the KiXX in exchange for the rights to Namazi.  He played for the Force until 2005.  In 2002 and 2003, Namazi played for the United States national futsal team.

Managerial career
In March 1999, the Philadelphia KiXX fired Dave MacWilliams. Namazi, on injured reserve after knee surgery, served as interim head coach.  His success led to a permanent contract in July 1999.  In 2001, Namazi took the KiXX to the MISL championship series where the team fell to the Milwaukee Wave.  In 2002, the KiXX won the championship, defeating the Wave.  Four games into the 2002–2003 season, Namazi left the KiXX to become head coach of the San Diego Spirit of Women's United Soccer Association.  He took the Spirit to the semifinals of the WUSA playoffs, the only season the Spirit made the playoffs.  The WUSA collapsed at the end of the season and Namazi returned to playing for the Cleveland Force in October 2003.  In March 2004, the Force named Namazi as interim head coach, making him the permanent head coach a month later.  He took the Force to the 2005 MISL championship series, losing to the Milwaukee Wave.  The Force collapsed during the off season.  On September 21, 2005, Namazi became the head coach of the St. Louis Steamers.  He took the Steamers to the championship series where they lost to the Baltimore Spirit.  The Steamers folded during the off-season and Namazi moved to California to coach youth soccer for a year.  He returned to coaching indoor soccer in September 2007 with the New Jersey Ironmen.  On June 3, 2010, Namazi was named head coach of the Chicago Red Stars in the Women's Professional Soccer, replacing Emma Hayes.

In December 2010, Namazi was named as an assistant coach to the Iran Pro League club Steel Azin F.C. On April 28, 2011, he became assistant coach of the Iranian national team alongside Carlos Queiroz and goalkeeping coach Dan Gaspar. On June 18, 2013, Iran qualified for the 2014 FIFA World Cup, before qualifying for the 2015 AFC Asian Cup months later. On March 26, 2014, Namazi became the assistant coach of the United States women's national soccer team. Later in the year, he became the assistant coach to Tab Ramos with the United States men's national under-20 soccer team.

In January 2016, Namazi was appointed as the new head coach for the United States men's national under-18 soccer team. He won the 2017 CONCACAF U-20 Championship as assistant coach of the US team with Tab Ramos and Brad Friedel.

In May 2018, Namazi became head coach of Persian Gulf Pro League side Zob Ahan with signing a one-year deal. However, he and the club agreed to part ways only six months into the appointment.

Namazi then joined the technical staff of the United States U20 national team under manager Tab Ramos. In the beginning of April 2019, Namazi was also hired at the Danish club FC Helsingør. He was responsible for all scouting in North America. On April 22, FC Helsingør sacked their manager, and the club announced that Namazi would take charge as a caretaker for the rest of the season. On June 8, 2019, he agreed to continue as manager for the club for the upcoming season. However, Namazi expressed regret two weeks later and announced that he would not continue with the Danish club and would move back to the United States.

On September 2, 2022, Namazi joined Hartford Athletic of the USL Championship as an assistant coach and director of scouting. The move reunites Namazi with recently appointed manager Tab Ramos, who Namazi had previously coached with while on the staff of the United States men's national under-20 soccer team and the Houston Dynamo.

Managerial statistics

References

External links
 US men's U-20 coaching staff
 MetroStars profile
 Baltimore Spirit/Blast stats
 Omid Namazi on Instagram

1964 births
Living people
American soccer coaches
American soccer players
American Indoor Soccer Association players
American Professional Soccer League players
American Soccer League (1988–89) players
Baltimore Spirit players
North Carolina Fusion U23 players
Reading F.C. players
American people of Iranian descent
Cleveland Force (2002–2005 MISL) players
Delaware Wizards players
Fort Lauderdale Strikers (1988–1994) players
Hershey Impact players
Houston Dynamo FC non-playing staff
Major Indoor Soccer League (2001–2008) coaches
Major Indoor Soccer League (2001–2008) players
Major League Soccer players
Maryland Bays players
New York Red Bulls players
National Professional Soccer League (1984–2001) coaches
National Professional Soccer League (1984–2001) players
Ocean City Nor'easters players
Philadelphia KiXX players
Staten Island Vipers players
USISL players
Washington Diplomats (1988–1990) players
West Virginia Mountaineers men's soccer players
Sportspeople of Iranian descent
Association football defenders
American men's futsal players
New Jersey Ironmen players
St. Louis Steamers (2003–2006 MISL) players
FC Helsingør managers
American expatriate soccer coaches
Chicago Red Stars coaches
Women's United Soccer Association coaches
Persian Gulf Pro League managers
Women's Professional Soccer coaches
Hartford Athletic coaches
USL Championship coaches